Market Street Railway is San Francisco Municipal Railway's (Muni) 1,200-member non-profit preservation partner. It relies on private contributions to help maintain San Francisco’s fleet of historic streetcars in service on the E Embarcadero and F Market & Wharves lines.

Market Street Railway developed and operates the San Francisco Railway Museum along Embarcadero route of the streetcars and operates the David Pharr Restoration Facility where Market Street Railway volunteers restore historic vehicles before donating them to Muni.

Market Street Railway borrows the name of the Market Street Railway Company, a former commercial streetcar and bus operator in San Francisco.

History

Founded in 1976, Market Street Railway members created the successful San Francisco Historic Trolley Festivals of the 1980s that resulted in the permanent return of historic streetcars to Market Street in the form of the F Market & Wharves line — the most popular service of its kind in all of North America. 

Service on the line, then called F Market, commenced on September 1, 1995, replacing Muni's 8 Market trolleybus line. In 1996, one year after service began, F Market streetcars carried an average of 7,758 passengers per day, a 43% increase in ridership over the 8 Market trolleybus. 

In the late 1990s, the Embarcadero was rebuilt as a tree-lined boulevard with streetcar tracks in the median. On March 4, 2000, the F Market line was extended to use the new tracks to travel between the Ferry Building and Fisherman's Wharf at the northern end of the waterfront. By 2008, F Market streetcars were carrying an average of 20,000 riders per day, and were so overcrowded that drivers were sometimes forced to skip stops. For comparison, the Muni Metro system carried an average of 130,000 passengers per day through the Market Street subway in 1999.

Service again expanded in 2015 with the E Embarcadero line which utilized the tracks on the Embarcadero south of the Ferry Building to Caltrain's 4th and King station.

Since its inception, Market Street Railway has helped Muni to acquire and restore more than a dozen historic streetcars and cable cars for service, adding diversity to Muni’s large historic fleet. Market Street Railway's restoration corps has done much of this restoration work themselves. Its volunteers also clean the cars' interiors at the Castro Street Terminal to improve rider experience.

References

External links

 

Heritage streetcar systems
Market Street (San Francisco)
Non-profit organizations based in California
Passenger rail transportation in California
Public transportation in San Francisco
San Francisco Municipal Railway